Shanghai, Shanghai, also known as The Shanghai Encounter, (Chinese: 亂世兒女) is a 1990 Hong Kong action film directed by Teddy Robin. Set in 1930s Shanghai, the film stars Sammo Hung, Yuen Biao, George Lam and Anita Mui.

Plot
Sammo Hung is the main villain of the film, who wants to hurt certain people throughout until Yuen Biao steps in to save the day.

Cast
Sammo Hung as Chin Hung-yun
Yuen Biao as Little Tiger
George Lam as Big Tiger
Anita Mui as Mary Sung Chia-pi
Lawrence Cheng as Chen Ta-wen
Sandy Lam as Pao
Lo Lieh as Pai
Mang Hoi as Hai
Louis Roth as General William Pottinger
Tien Niu as Ting-ting
Kirk Wong as Chiang
Yuen Tak as Acrobat

Crew
Fu Chi-chung – art direction
Teddy Robin – director, music
Dion Lam – action director
Peggy Lee – line production manager
Corey Yuen – producer, action director
Yuen Tak – action director

Sources
Luan shi er nu, IMDb. Accessed 19 October 2012

External links
Luan shi er nu, Rotten Tomatoes

1990 films
Hong Kong action films
1990 action films
1990 martial arts films
1990s Cantonese-language films
Hong Kong martial arts films
Girls with guns films
Golden Harvest films
Films set in Shanghai
Films set in the 1930s
Films set in the Republic of China (1912–1949)
1990s Hong Kong films